Thank Your Lucky Stars is the tenth studio album by power electronics band Whitehouse, released in 1990 through the newly formed Susan Lawly label. Recorded in September 1988, it was the group's first studio album after a period of inactivity during the later half of the 1980s and the first to feature contributions from writer and musician Peter Sotos and production work from Steve Albini. A special edition was issued in 1997 on CD format that contained bonus tracks  previously released on other Whitehouse albums and singles.

Production
Albini said that each song on the album was influenced by a different heavy metal song.

Track listing

Personnel
William Bennett – vocals, synthesizers, production
Kevin Tomkins – lyrics, photography
Peter Sotos – synthesizers, lyrics
Steve Albini  – recording, production
Hayley – photography
Leslie Jacobs – photography
Denis Blackham – mastering

References

External links
 

1990 albums
Whitehouse (band) albums
Albums produced by Steve Albini